Erik Harris (born April 2, 1990) is an American football free safety for the Atlanta Falcons of the National Football League (NFL). He played college football at California (PA). He has also been a member of the Hamilton Tiger-Cats of the Canadian Football League (CFL) and the New Orleans Saints. Harris is known for playing many positions, including free and strong safety, halfback (which has an entirely different meaning than the American football halfback), cornerback, weakside linebacker and strong-side linebacker.

Early life and college
Harris was born in Los Angeles, California. When Harris was two months old, his parents separated and he moved to Baltimore with his mother. Harris and his mother moved to Pennsylvania when he was in the fifth grade. He attended New Oxford High School in New Oxford, Pennsylvania.

He attended California University of Pennsylvania, playing safety for the Division II California Vulcans football team. In four college seasons, he made 231 tackles on defense. He was a First-team All-Pennsylvania State Athletic Conference (All-PSAC) selection in 2010. He was a Second-team All-PSAC selection in 2011.

Professional career
Harris was rated the 90th best strong safety in the 2012 NFL Draft by NFLDraftScout.com.  Harris was not drafted.

Hamilton Tiger-Cats
Harris was signed by the Hamilton Tiger-Cats on April 11, 2013. He played in 45 games for Hamilton, making 79 defensive tackles and 27 special teams tackles. He caught a touchdown on offense and recorded three interceptions.

New Orleans Saints

2016 season
On February 2, 2016, the New Orleans Saints signed Harris to a reserve/future contract after a recommendation by Delvin Breaux, who had played with him while on the Hamilton Tiger-Cats. Harris agreed to a three-year, $1.62 million contract. Joel Erickson of The Advocate noted that Harris was a CFL linebacker but that he had the ability to play as an NFL defensive back. After former Saints safety Rafael Bush signed with the Detroit Lions, New Orleans announced that Harris would play safety. On October 10, 2016, Harris sustained a torn ACL during practice and was placed on the injured reserve list October 13, 2016. He finished his rookie campaign with one solo tackle in four games.

2017 season
Throughout training camp, Harris competed to be the starting free safety against Vonn Bell and Rafael Bush after the role was left vacant by the departure of Jairus Byrd. On September 2, 2017, the New Orleans Saints waived Harris.

Oakland / Las Vegas Raiders

2017 season
On September 5, 2017, the Oakland Raiders signed Harris to a one-year, $630,000 contract. Harris was initially signed to provide depth after rookie Obi Melifonwu was placed on injured-reserve. Head coach Jack Del Rio named Harris the primary backup free safety, behind Karl Joseph, to start the 2017 regular season. Harris appeared in 15 games in 2017, primarily on special teams, and finished the season with five combined tackles (four solo). On December 31, 2017, the Oakland Raiders fired head coach Jack Del Rio after they finished the season with a 6-10 record.

2018 season
Harris entered training camp as a backup safety and competed to be a primary backup against Obi Melifonwu, Marcus Gilchrist, Shalom Luani, Dallin Leavitt and Tevin Mitchel. Head coach Jon Gruden names Harris the primary backup strong safety, behind Karl Joseph, to begin the 2018 NFL season. On October 28, 2018, Harris earned his first career start and recorded a season-high six solo tackles during a 42-28 loss against the Indianapolis Colts. In Week 14, he collected a season-high eight combined tackles (four solo) as the Raiders defeated the Pittsburgh Steelers 24-21. On December 16, 2018, Harris recorded three solo tackles, deflected two passes, and made his first career interception during a 30-16 loss at the Cincinnati Bengals. Harris made his first career interception off a pass by Bengals' quarterback Jeff Driskel, that was originally intended for John Ross. Harris made 49 combined tackles (36 solo), seven pass deflections, and two interceptions in 16 games and four starts.

2019 season
On March 8, 2019, the Oakland Raiders signed Harris to a two-year, $5 million contract that included $1.07 million guaranteed. Harris entered training camp slated as a backup safety after the Raiders drafted Johnathan Abram in the first round. Head coach Jon Gruden retained Harris as the primary backup strong safety, behind Karl Joseph, to start the season.

Harris became the starting free safety in Week 2 after Johnathan Abram was placed on injured-reserve after tearing his rotator cuff during the Raiders' season-opening 24–16 victory against the Denver Broncos. In Week 2, Harris earned his first career start and recorded two solo tackles during a 28–10 loss against the Kansas City Chiefs.
On September 29, 2019, Harris made seven combined tackles (six solo), a pass deflection, and returned his first career interception for a touchdown during a 31–24 win at the Indianapolis Colts. Harris intercepted a pass attempt by Jacoby Brissett, that was intended for wide receiver Zach Pascal, and returned it for a 30-yard touchdown during the fourth quarter.
 On November 7, 2019, Harris made one tackle and intercepted two passes by Chargers' quarterback Philip Rivers during a 26–24 victory against the Los Angeles Chargers on Thursday Night Football. Harris intercepted a pass that was intended for tight end Hunter Henry for a 56-yard touchdown during the first quarter. He finished the 2019 NFL season with 68 combined tackles (59 solo), eight pass deflections, three interceptions, and two touchdowns in 16 games and 14 starts.

2020 season
Harris was placed on the reserve/COVID-19 list by the Raiders on December 21, 2020, and activated on January 1, 2021.

Atlanta Falcons

On March 19, 2021, Harris signed a one-year contract with the Atlanta Falcons. He entered the 2021 season as the Falcons' starting free safety. Harris suffered a torn pectoral in Week 14 and was placed on season-ending injured reserve. He finished the season with 64 tackles and eight passes defensed through 12 starts.

On March 25, 2022, Harris re-signed with the Falcons on a one-year contract.

Personal life
Harris is married to Theresa Harris, whom he met in New Oxford High School. They have four children: Ellis, Esme, and twin sons, Isaiah and Elijah, who were born in the summer of 2013.

References

External links
Just Sports Stats
NFL Draft Scout
Hamilton Tiger-Cats profile

Living people
1990 births
People from Adams County, Pennsylvania
Players of American football from Pennsylvania
Players of American football from Los Angeles
American football defensive backs
Canadian football defensive backs
American players of Canadian football
California Vulcans football players
Hamilton Tiger-Cats players
Atlanta Falcons players
New Orleans Saints players
Las Vegas Raiders players
Oakland Raiders players
Players of Canadian football from Los Angeles